Doronicum grandiflorum is a European species of Doronicum, a member of the family Asteraceae.

Doronicum grandiflorum is a perennial herb growing 10–40 cm. (4-16 inches) tall and producing numerous yellow flower heads borne singly on hairy stalks. The large, ovate (egg-shaped) ground-leaves have toothed edges and are supported by long, narrow petioles. The flower stems also bear leaves spaced alternately along the lower half of the stem. These hug the stem and are ovate to lanceolate. The leaves are heavily densely beset with both glandular and non-glandular hairs. The flower heads are 4–6 cm. (1.5-2.5 in.) wide and have both yellow ray and disc flowers. Flowers appear from July through August.

Distribution and habitat
This species is found growing in limestone rubble and gravel, such as that one eroding mountain slopes. It is native to mountainous regions between 1400 and 3400 m in altitude in the Alps, Pyrenees and northern Balkans (nations of Spain, France, Germany, Italy, Switzerland, Austria, Greece, Albania, Romania, and the western Balkans).

References

External links

Plants described in 1786
Flora of Europe
Senecioneae
Taxa named by Jean-Baptiste Lamarck